When the Mother and the Daughter is a 1928 German silent film directed by Carl Boese and starring Fritz Spira, Trude Hesterberg, and Vera Schmiterlöw.

Cast

References

Bibliography

External links

1928 films
Films of the Weimar Republic
German silent feature films
Films directed by Carl Boese
National Film films
German black-and-white films